New Bolgenschanze is an abandoned K74 ski jumping hill at Davos, Switzerland from 1928. It was located on the same road as old Bolgenschanze, approximately 500 meters away.

History
In December 1928 the hill, planned by Grünenfelder and Straumann, was completed. Local Swiss jumper E. Maurer from Davos made an inaugural test jump and set first but unofficial hill record at 57 meters (197 ft).

In 1930, Davos hosted Academic World Winter Games, when Fritz Kaufmann jumped 73 meters during intern training of Swiss national team.

On 24 February 1931, Sigmund Ruud set the only official world record on this hill at 81 metres (266 ft). Local Fritz Kaufmann won the international competition.

In March 1932, Sigmund Ruud jumped 82 meters (269 ft) in hours concours (unofficially after competition) tied the Robert Lymburne's WR distance short after (he set it on 12 March), but both of them were never officially recognized.

With its modern profile the Bolgenschanze attended a lot of worldwide attention in those days and was assessed very much by the international jumper's elite, consequently Davos was the jumping stronghold of Switzerland.

Hill and world records

 Official world record!
 Not recognized! Hill record set on hill test.
 Not recognized! Hill record set on Swiss internal training.
 Not recognized! Tied Lymburne's WR distance, set hors concours (out of ompetition).

References

External links
New Bolgenschanze skisprungschanzen.com

Ski jumping venues in Switzerland
Defunct sports venues in Switzerland